The Bermuda Sun was a Bermudian newspaper, published on Wednesdays and Fridays.

Covering a wide range of topics including news, sports, business and lifestyle, it also published the Government of Bermuda's legal notices.

Foundation
The newspaper began in 1964, edited by Martin Dier.

Ownership and administration
It was published by Island Press Limited, whose parent company, MediaHouse Limited, reported a $2.9 million profit for the first half of 2009.

, the newspaper's publisher was Randy French and its editor-in-chief was Tony McWilliam.

Awards
The newspaper won two Best of Bermuda Awards in the June 2012 issue of The Bermudian magazine. Its online module, The Bermuda Sun Online, was named Best Source of Local News and Information while Larry Burchall was named Best Critical Columnist.

Sister organisation
The newspaper is a sister company to bermuda.com, a website dedicated to Bermuda tourism.

Closure
The last ever issue was published on Wednesday 30 July 2014.

See also

 Lists of newspapers
 Warren Brown

References

External links
 bermudasun.bm, the newspaper's official website

20th-century establishments in Bermuda
English-language newspapers published in North America
Hamilton, Bermuda
Newspapers published in Bermuda
Publications established in 1964
Publications disestablished in 2014